Jasmine Camacho-Quinn (born August 21, 1996) is a Puerto Rican  track and field athlete who specializes in the 100 metres hurdles. At the 2020 Tokyo Olympics, she became the first Puerto Rican of Afro-Latino descent and the second person representing Puerto Rico to win a gold medal. In the semi-finals, Camacho-Quinn set her personal best and Olympic record of 12.26 seconds, which is tied for the fifth fastest time in history.  

Camacho-Quinn participated at the 2016 Rio Olympics in her specialty event, achieving 12.70 seconds in the heats, a time that would have secured her fifth place in the final. However, she was disqualified in the semi-finals after hitting a hurdle.

Progression
All information taken from World Athletics profile.

100 metres hurdles

100 metres

200 metres

Long jump

Major achievements

Personal life
Her parents are James Quinn, an African-American man, and María Milagros Camacho, a Puerto Rican woman. Both competed in athletics at Baptist College (now Charleston Southern University) in South Carolina, United States of America, with her father competing in hurdles and her mother as a sprint runner and long jumper. Camacho-Quinn's mother, María Milagros Camacho, is from Trujillo Alto, Puerto Rico, which made Camacho-Quinn eligible to represent Puerto Rico in international competitions, including in the Olympics. National Football League (NFL) player Robert Quinn is her brother.
Jasmine graduated from Fort Dorchester High School, in North Charleston, South Carolina.

Identity
Born and raised in South Carolina, Camacho-Quinn decided later in life that she wanted to know more about her mother's side of the family, who live in Trujillo Alto, Puerto Rico. She identifies as a Puerto Rican. In July 2021, she tweeted about her mother, "You see my mommy? The PUERTO RICAN woman that birthed me?" and stated "I am Puerto Rican" in a video posted by the Puerto Rican Olympic Committee. 

Camacho-Quinn is the first Afro-Puerto Rican to win a gold medal. This was celebrated by social anthropologist Bárbara Abadía-Rexach, who stated "Camacho-Quinn’s victory is a pioneering example for black girls on the island that shows them they can achieve whatever they set their minds to, despite the systemic barriers they will encounter due to their gender, race and ethnicity."

See also

 List of Puerto Ricans
 List of Olympic medalists in athletics (women)
 100 metres hurdles

References

External links

 
 Jasmine Camacho-Quinn on Instagram

Videos
 Jasmine Camacho-Quinn flies to OR in the women's 100m hurdles | Tokyo Olympics  – via NBC Sports on YouTube

1996 births
Living people
Olympic track and field athletes of Puerto Rico
African-American people
Athletes (track and field) at the 2016 Summer Olympics
Athletes (track and field) at the 2020 Summer Olympics
Puerto Rican female hurdlers
Olympic gold medalists for Puerto Rico
People from Ladson, South Carolina
Kentucky Wildcats women's track and field athletes
People of Afro–Puerto Rican descent
American people of Puerto Rican descent
Olympic gold medalists in athletics (track and field)
Medalists at the 2020 Summer Olympics
[[Category:World Athletics Championships medalists]